Resting bitch face, also known as RBF, or bitchy resting face (BRF), is a facial expression that unintentionally creates the impression that a person is angry, annoyed, irritated, or contemptuous, particularly when the individual is relaxed, resting, or not expressing any particular emotion.
The concept has been studied by psychologists and may have psychological implications related to facial biases, gender stereotypes, human judgement and decision-making. The concept has also been studied by scientists with information technology - using a type of facial recognition system, they found that the phenomenon is real and the condition is as common in males as in females, despite the gendered word bitch that is used to name the concept.

History 
In a 2013 year-end round-up of newly popular words and phrases, The New York Times writer Grant Barrett asserted that the phrase dates back "at least ten years". In December 2012, a joke by Clare O'Kane about being harassed for having RBF, "I look bitchy and sleepy," was spotlighted in a SFGate.com review of a San Francisco sketch show.

On May 22, 2013, the comedy group Broken People uploaded a parody public service announcement video titled "Bitchy Resting Face" (BRF) on the Funny or Die website in which male and female "sufferers" of an annoyed-looking blank expression ask for understanding from non-sufferers. The video features comedian Milana Vayntrub.

The facial expression has gone on to become a popular Internet meme identified by the acronym RBF.

Spread in wider culture

The term has become widely referred to in the media. It has made its way into lifestyle and fashion magazines for women such as Cosmopolitan and Elle, and been mentioned in published literature, both fiction and non-fiction.

Hadley Freeman wrote that since it appeared in the Broken People video, it had enjoyed a stratospheric rise, and pointed out that the male equivalent term Resting Asshole Face (RAF) highlighted in this video had not received the same degree of comment. New York University psychologist Jonathan Freeman carried out a study showing that slightly angry facial expressions make other people think you are untrustworthy.

In a 2014 article in the journal Philological Quarterly, Chloé Hogg, asserted that the phenomenon was not new, and offered Hyacinthe Rigaud's portrait of Louis XIV of France depicting his "bitchy resting face". Levels of resting bitch face can vary greatly, with different magnitudes and amounts of fierceness.

In 2015, CBS News reported that some plastic surgeons were using plastic surgery to help patients with RBF.

In October 2015, scientists from the company Noldus Information Technology used their FaceReader software to analyze the faces of celebrities like Kanye West, Kristen Stewart, Anna Kendrick and Queen Elizabeth II, notable public figures who have been known to occasionally wear a less-than-pleased expression, and proved that resting bitch face does exist.

See also
 Facial feedback hypothesis
 Grumpy Cat
 Social identity theory

References

Facial expressions
Internet memes